This is a  list of mayors and chiefs of government of the city of Buenos Aires, Argentina's capital, since its federalization.

Its first Mayor (Intendant) was Torcuato de Alvear, who was appointed by President Julio Argentino Roca following the city's federalization. For the next 110 years, the intendant was directly appointed by the president, meaning that Buenos Aires had less autonomy than the smallest municipality.

Following the 1994 amendment of the Argentine Constitution, the city gained autonomous status. The title of the city's chief executive was changed to Chief of Government (Jefe de Gobierno), who was directly elected by universal suffrage. He was assisted by a Vice-Chief of Government (Vicejefe de Gobierno), elected on the same ticket.  However, in popular usage, especially outside of Argentina, the chief and vice-chief are often called mayor and vice-mayor, respectively.

The chief and vice chief are elected on a single ticket for a term of four years, with possibility of reelection. The first directly elected Chief of Government to be elected was Fernando de la Rúa, who was elected president three years into his term.

In 2006, Chief Aníbal Ibarra was removed from his position following impeachment regarding the Cromagnon nightclub tragedy, leaving Vice-Chief Jorge Telerman to take over the office.

In the June 24, 2007 elections, Mauricio Macri was elected Chief of Government, winning in the second round with 60.96% of the votes against Daniel Filmus. Horacio Rodríguez Larreta became mayor in 2015, after defeating Michetti in the primary elections and Martín Lousteau in a ballotage.

Mayors (1883–1996)

Chiefs of government (1996–present)

See also

Politics of Argentina
Autonomous City of Buenos Aires
Federalization of Buenos Aires

Buenos Aires
Lists of political office-holders in Argentina